Sužionys is a village in Vilnius District Municipality, Lithuania, it is located only about  north of Vilnius city municipality. According to the 2021 census, it had population of 397, a decrease from 449 in 2011, and 608 in 1987.

History
Environs of Sužionys were inhabited from the 1st millennium BC.  with archaeological remains of an ancient settlement is situated near the village. Sužionys itself was mentioned for the first times in written sources in 1554. A modest neoclassical church, that is now standing, was built in 1795.

References

Villages in Vilnius County
Vilnius District Municipality